Namestovo is a rural locality (a village) in Oktyabrskoye Rural Settlement, Vyaznikovsky District, Vladimir Oblast, Russia. The population was 13 as of 2010.

Geography 
Namestovo is located 19 km southwest of Vyazniki (the district's administrative centre) by road. Vaskino is the nearest rural locality.

References 

Rural localities in Vyaznikovsky District